Jeremiah Michael Collins (21 August 1882 – 29 June 1967) was an Irish athlete, Gaelic football trainer and greyhound racing judge.

Born in Farranfore, County Kerry, Collins was born to Michael and Mary Collins (née Brosnan). He was educated locally and later emigrated to England where he worked in the civil service.

An athlete in his youth, Collins returned to Dublin in 1913 and took the role of trainer of the Kerry senior football team. In 1924 he guided the team to the All-Ireland title.

References

1882 births
1967 deaths
Gaelic football managers
Irish civil servants